Jake Hoffman is an Arizona state senator in Arizona's 15th district. He was previously a state representative in Arizona's 12th district. He was elected to the seat after incumbent Republican Warren Petersen decided to run for the Arizona Senate. He and incumbent Travis Grantham won in a twoseat election in 2020, both defeating Democrat Kristin Clark by over 85,000 votes.

Hoffman runs a digital-marketing company, Rally Forge.  The Guardian reported that Rally Forge also formed a fake left-wing front group, America Progress Now, which promoted Green Party candidates online in 2018. Rally Forge was banned from Facebook in 2020 when Hoffman was permanently suspended by Twitter. As of 2021, he is the vice-chair of the Arizona House's Committee on Government and Elections.

After Democratic candidate Joe Biden won the state of Arizona in the 2020 election, Hoffman declared himself an elector and attempted to submit documents to the National Archive saying that Arizona had been won by Republican candidate Donald Trump. In 2022, Hoffman proposed to divide Maricopa County into three new counties, since 65% of the Arizona’s population is contained by that single county. Critics claimed that the proposal was intended to punish election officials in Maricopa County for not overturning the 2020 election results based on Trump's claims of fraud.

References

Living people
Republican Party members of the Arizona House of Representatives
21st-century American politicians
Year of birth missing (living people)